McKinney Acres is a census-designated place (CDP) in Andrews County, Texas, United States. The population was 815 at the 2010 census. This was a new CDP for the 2010 census.

Geography
McKinney Acres is located at  (32.296357, -102.529776). It lies along the southern border of Andrews, the county seat. U.S. Route 385 runs along the western edge of the CDP, leading south  to Odessa.

References

Census-designated places in Andrews County, Texas
Census-designated places in Texas